Aulonogyrus is a genus of beetles in the family Gyrinidae, containing the following species:

 Aulonogyrus abdominalis (Aubé, 1838)
 Aulonogyrus abyssinicus Régimbart, 1883
 Aulonogyrus aculeatulus Ochs, 1933
 Aulonogyrus acutus Brinck, 1955
 Aulonogyrus algoensis Régimbart, 1883
 Aulonogyrus alternatus Régimbart, 1892
 Aulonogyrus amoenulus (Boheman, 1848)
 Aulonogyrus angustatus (Dahl, 1823)
 Aulonogyrus antipodum Fauvel, 1903
 Aulonogyrus arrowi Régimbart, 1907
 Aulonogyrus ater Brinck, 1955
 Aulonogyrus aureus Brinck, 1955
 Aulonogyrus bachmanni Ochs, 1937
 Aulonogyrus bedeli Régimbart, 1883
 Aulonogyrus caffer (Aubé, 1838)
 Aulonogyrus camerunensis Ochs, 1933
 Aulonogyrus capensis (Thunberg, 1781)
 Aulonogyrus capensis Bjerken, 1787
 Aulonogyrus carinipennis Régimbart, 1895
 Aulonogyrus centralis Ochs, 1928
 Aulonogyrus clementi Legros, 1946
 Aulonogyrus concinnus (Klug in Ehrenberg, 1834)
 Aulonogyrus conspicuus Ochs, 1929
 Aulonogyrus convena Guignot, 1955
 Aulonogyrus cristatus Régimbart, 1903
 Aulonogyrus denti Ochs, 1937
 Aulonogyrus depressus Brinck, 1955
 Aulonogyrus elegantissimus Régimbart, 1883
 Aulonogyrus epipleuricus Régimbart, 1906
 Aulonogyrus flavipes (Boheman, 1848)
 Aulonogyrus flaviventris Régimbart, 1906
 Aulonogyrus formosus (Modeer, 1776)
 Aulonogyrus graueri Ochs, 1937
 Aulonogyrus hypoxanthus Régimbart, 1906
 Aulonogyrus inyanganensis Mazzoldi, 1996
 Aulonogyrus kasikiensis Ochs, 1937
 Aulonogyrus knysnanus Brinck, 1955
 Aulonogyrus latens Brinck, 1955
 Aulonogyrus luimbalus Brinck, 1955
 Aulonogyrus malkini Brinck, 1955
 Aulonogyrus manoviensis Ochs, 1937
 Aulonogyrus marginatus (Aubé, 1838)
 Aulonogyrus monticola Brinck, 1951
 Aulonogyrus naviculus Brinck, 1955
 Aulonogyrus obliquus (Walker, 1858)
 Aulonogyrus rhodesianus Brinck, 1955
 Aulonogyrus sesotho Brinck, 1966
 Aulonogyrus seydeli Ochs, 1954
 Aulonogyrus sharpi Régimbart, 1883
 Aulonogyrus splendidulus (Dupont in Aubé, 1838)
 Aulonogyrus striatus (Fabricius, 1792)
 Aulonogyrus strigosus (Fabricius, 1801)
 Aulonogyrus varians Brinck, 1955
 Aulonogyrus vethi Régimbart, 1886
 Aulonogyrus wehnckei Régimbart, 1883

References

Gyrinidae
Adephaga genera
Taxa named by Victor Motschulsky